Hans Dürer (born 21 February 1490 in Nuremberg; died ca. 1538 in Kraków), was a German Renaissance painter, illustrator, and engraver.

The son of Albrecht Dürer the Elder, he was the younger brother of Albrecht Dürer, and after him, the most talented of 17 siblings. Most siblings died in childhood.  He was certain to have been trained in the workshop of his already famous brother.  He became the court painter for King Sigismund I the Old of Poland. He went to live and work in Kraków for some time, like many other Nuremberg artists

External links 
 Dürer at auction, Christie's NY

1490 births
1530s deaths
Year of death uncertain
Place of death missing
16th-century German painters
German male painters
German Renaissance painters
German people of Hungarian descent
Court painters of Polish kings
German expatriates in Poland
Artists from Nuremberg